Cumhuriyet (English: "Republic") is the oldest up-market Turkish daily newspaper. It has been described as "the most important independent public interest newspaper in contemporary Turkey". The newspaper was awarded the Freedom of Press Prize by Reporters Without Borders in 2015 and the Alternative Nobel Prize in 2016.  It is considered Turkey's newspaper of record. It has been known for its stance of publishing anti-Islamist titles and news at least since the 1960s.

Established on 7 May 1924 by journalist Yunus Nadi Abalıoğlu, a confidant of the Turkish Republic's founder Mustafa Kemal Atatürk, the newspaper has subscribed to a staunchly secular, republican course. In the past closely affiliated with the Kemalist Republican People's Party (CHP), the newspaper turned to a more independent course over time, advocating democracy, social liberal values and free markets. Today, "being a Cumhuriyet reader has become synonymous with embracing democratic values and a pluralistic society".

The newspaper's anti-government advertisements before the 2007 Turkish presidential election and general election caused controversy for "warning" voters against the AKP government with the message "Are you aware of the danger?". Notably, the newspaper has also broken the story on the treasonous 2014 National Intelligence Organisation scandal in Turkey, reprinted the scandalous  cartoons from Charlie Hebdo, and reported on the Panama Papers and Paradise Papers affairs while linking prominent Turkish figures to the documents.

Cumhuriyet has been targeted throughout its history, such as with the assassinations of Uğur Mumcu, Bahriye Üçok, Ahmet Taner Kışlalı, Muammer Aksoy, Ümit Kaftancıoğlu, Onat Kutlar, and Cavit Orhan Tütengil. More recent attacks include the 2008 molotov attack on the newspaper's headquarters in Istanbul's Şişli district and the attempted assassination of Can Dündar in 2016. The newspaper has been described as "a high-profile target in the Erdoğan government’s crackdown on media". By the end of 2016, almost half of the paper's reporters, columnists and executives had been jailed.

History

The founding editor-in-chief of Cumhuriyet was Zekeriya Sertel, a Turkish journalist. Following the death of Yunus Nadi on 28 March 1945 in Geneva, Switzerland, Cumhuriyet was owned by his eldest son  until his death on 20 August 1991. Nadir Nadi's wife Berin then published the newspaper. Cumhuriyet has been owned by the Cumhuriyet Foundation since the death of Berin Nadi on 5 November 2001. One of its publishers was the renowned political columnist İlhan Selçuk, who was also chairman of the board of trustees and lead writer (from 1992) until his death in 2010.

Cumhuriyet contributors such as Uğur Mumcu, Bahriye Üçok, Ahmet Taner Kışlalı, Muammer Aksoy, Ümit Kaftancıoğlu, Onat Kutlar, and Cavit Orhan Tütengil were assassinated between the 1970s and 1990s.

During the Gulf War, Cumhuriyet suffered a collapse in advertising revenue, and following an unrelated dispute over editorial policy, nearly 40 journalists and commentators walked out in November 1991: "Circulation fell by half, and it was saved only by an extraordinary campaign by readers to buy extra copies and even pay money into a special account." Hasan Cemal, chief editor since 1981, resigned in January 1992 over the dispute: "I tried to widen the spectrum, to keep the balance. But they (old-guard intellectuals) always resisted, calling us plotters, tools of big business and the United States".

Since 17 October 2005, the newspaper's headquarters have been located in Istanbul's Şişli district, after being the last newspaper to leave the traditional press district of Cağaloğlu. The newspaper also has offices in Ankara and İzmir.

The newspaper's advertisements before the 2007 Turkish presidential election and general election with the message "Are you aware of the danger?" were controversial.

's office in Istanbul was the site of a molotov attack in 2008.

In 2010, the newspaper was one of the first up-market newspapers in Turkey to abandon the established broadsheet format for the midi-sized Berliner format.

In January 2015, the newspaper reprinted cartoons from Charlie Hebdo, a French satirical magazine which had depicted the Islamic prophet Muhammad and been subject to a terror attack. As a result, Cumhuriyet received threats and was placed under police protection.

In 2015, it was awarded the Freedom of Press Prize by international NGO Reporters Without Borders for making a stand against the AKP government's mounting pressure.

On 22 September 2016 the newspaper was awarded the Right Livelihood Award for its "fearless investigative reporting and standing up for freedom of speech and opinion despite being subject to death threats, censorship and state prosecution".

In 2016 the newspaper reported on the Panama Papers and in 2017 on the Paradise Papers affairs, linking a number of prominent Turkish figures to those.

The editor-in-chief of the online edition, Oğuz Güven, was arrested on 12 May 2017 in connection with an article on the "accidental" death of Mustafa Alper, the first public prosecutor to file an indictment about the Gülenist Terror Organization (FETÖ). Güven was released pending trial on 14 June 2017.

Today, the newspaper is struggling financially due to a low daily circulation figure that has fallen from more than 150,000 in the mid-1990s, in addition to plummeting advertising revenues as companies are not willing to advertise in media critical of the government.

MİT trucks scandal 

Following the appointment of new editor-in-chief Can Dündar, the newspaper on 29 May 2015 released detailed footage depicting trucks of the Turkish National Intelligence Organization (MİT) carrying weapons to Syrian rebels in neighboring Syria. While the government faced calls to resign, an investigation began into Cumhuriyet for releasing the footage. Turkish President Erdoğan publicly targeted Dündar, stating: "I suppose the person who wrote this as an exclusive report will pay a heavy price for this."

In spite of the threats, Cumhuriyet published further material on June 11, including photos and videos confirming that MİT trucks transported both weapons and militants between Turkey and various locations in neighboring Syria. In November, the newspaper was awarded the 2015 Reporters Without Borders Prize for its "independent and courageous journalism." Shortly thereafter, editor-in-chief Dündar and Ankara bureau chief Erdem Gül were arrested on charges of being members of a terror organization, espionage and revealing confidential documents, facing sentences up to life imprisonment.

Circulation and online edition
In 1924 Cumhuriyet sold 5,000-10,000 copies. On 7 May 1998, the newspaper launched its online edition. The print circulation figure was around 40,000 copies in May 2018.

Notable contributors (past and present)

Supplements 

Supplements of the newspaper:

Strateji (Strategy), Mondays
Kitap (Book), Thursdays
Bilim Teknoloji (Science and Technology), Fridays
Hafta Sonu (Weekend), Saturdays
Pazar (Sunday), Sundays
Gezi (Travel), every other Wednesday
Tarım (Agriculture), once a month
Yerel Yönetimler (Local Governments)
Le Monde diplomatique Türkiye (Le Monde diplomatique Turkey), the first Monday of the month (since February 3, 2020)

See also
List of newspapers in Turkey
La Repubblica, a newspaper in Italy with a similar name, format and political alignment
Turkey's media purge after the failed July 2016 coup d'état

References

External links

 

1924 establishments in Turkey
Daily newspapers published in Turkey
Mass media freedom in Turkey
Newspapers established in 1924
Newspapers published in Istanbul
Şişli
Turkish-language newspapers